Hanna Wolf (1908–1999) was an East German historian and socialist politician. She left Germany in 1932 for the Soviet Union where she became a Soviet citizen. She settled in the East Germany in 1947 and held various posts, including the rector of Karl Marx Academy. She was a long-term member of the central committee of the Socialist Unity Party (SED).

Early life and education
She was born in Goniądz, Poland, on 4 February 1908. Her father was a rabbi. In 1922 she became a member of the Polish branch of the Young Communist League of Germany. She studied philosophy and history at the University of Berlin.

Career and exile
Following her graduation she worked as a teacher. In 1927 she left the Jewish community. She joined the Communist Party of Germany in 1930. She went to the Soviet Union in April 1932 after the Nazi Party began to gain power. There she became a Soviet citizen in 1934 and involved in scientific research. Between 1942 and 1947 she was teacher at the Central School for German War Prisoners in Krasnogorsk, Moscow Oblast. 

Wolf settled in East Germany in 1947 and held several posts. She first worked at the Central Administration for Public Education. In 1950 she became a citizen of East Germany. In September of that year she was named as rector of the Karl Marx Academy which was run by the SED and remained in office until June 1983. However, she did not publish any scholarly study. In 1954 she became a candidate member of the SED's central committee. She was made its full member in 1958 which she held until 1989. The same year she was also promoted to the professorship. From 1983 to 1989 she was consultant at the central committee of the SED. She was one of the most influential and Stalinist members of the SED.

Wolf joined the Party of Democratic Socialism, successor of the SED, but she was expelled from the party on 10 February 1990.

Personal life and death
Wolf married three times. She died in Berlin on 22 June 1999.

Awards
Wolf was the recipient of the following: Soviet medal of Fatherland (1946), Banner of Labor (1959), Clara Zetkin Medal (1964), Order of Karl Marx (1965; 1978), Patriotic Order of Merit (Gold; 1968), Soviet Order of the Fatherland (1970) and Lenin Commemorative Medal (1970).

References

20th-century German women politicians
1908 births
1999 deaths
Members of the Central Committee of the Socialist Unity Party of Germany
Humboldt University of Berlin alumni
Communist Party of Germany members
Refugees from Nazi Germany in the Soviet Union
20th-century German historians
German people of Polish-Jewish descent
Recipients of the Patriotic Order of Merit in gold
People from Podlaskie Voivodeship